The boatnerd corporation, a registered not for profit corporation, circulates information about vessels that ply the North American Great Lakes.
When Acheson Ventures provided space for a headquarters for the organization in their Maritime Center overlooking the St Clair River, they called boatnerd "the most widely-used website for Great Lakes maritime information."
Reporters consider the boatnerd site reliable enough that they cite or quote it by name in their articles.

The organization was profiled by The Globe and Mail in 2008.
The organization holds annual festivals, at sites of interest to those interested in maritime commerce on the Great Lakes.
The Globe and Mail profiled boatnerd when the 2008 festival was held in a shipyard in Port Colborne, Ontario, where the Calumet, an 80-year-old lake freighter was being scrapped.
According to The Globe and Mail the site gets over 20 million page views a month.
According to The Globe and Mail the site's volunteers often report breaking news prior to its announcement by official authorities. The Globe and Mail quoted a volunteer who described how, while professional mariners kidded the volunteers, they obviously monitored it, because they could count on regular mariners promptly informing them when they had made a mistake.

The organization is large enough to maintain an office in Port Huron, Michigan, overlooking the confluence of the St Clair and Black Rivers.
The site went online in 1995, and became a registered not for profit corporation in 2006, under the name Great Lakes & Seaway Shipping Online.

Travel writer Bob Boughner, reporting in the Chatham Daily News, in December 2014, that "The average person, like myself, would have no idea where the ships were headed or what they were carrying if it wasn't for a relatively new organization headquartered in Port Huron, Mich., known as BoatNerd.com."

The organization provides unusual prizes through fund-raising raffles.
Various lake freighters were built with an "owner's suite".  These suites are rarely used today, but the organization has been able to convince shipping companies to make cruises on board a working lake freighter, in the owner's suite, available to donors.  76 donors have won Great Lake freighter cruises.

References

External links
 Boat Nerd website

Water transportation in North America